Gran Morelos is one of the 67 municipalities of Chihuahua, in northern Mexico. The municipal seat lies at San Nicolás de Carretas. The municipality covers an area of 424.2 km².

As of 2010, the municipality had a total population of 3,209, up from 3,092 as of 2005. 

The municipality had 48 localities, none of which had a population over 1,000.

References

Municipalities of Chihuahua (state)